The 1991–92 Eastern Counties Football League season was the 50th in the history of Eastern Counties Football League a football competition in England.

Premier Division

The Premier Division featured 20 clubs which competed in the division last season, along with two new clubs, promoted from Division One:
Brightlingsea United
Norwich United

League table

Division One

Division One featured 17 clubs which competed in the division last season, along with three new clubs:
Cambridge City reserves
Hadleigh United, joined from the Suffolk and Ipswich League
Sudbury Wanderers, joined from the Essex and Suffolk Border League

League table

References

External links
 Eastern Counties Football League

1991-92
1991–92 in English football leagues